The General Survey Act was a law passed by the United States Congress in April 1824, which authorized the president to have surveys made of routes for transport roads and canals "of national importance, in a commercial or military point of view, or necessary for the transportation of public mail."  While such infrastructure of national scope had been discussed and shown wanting for years, its passage shortly followed the landmark US Supreme Court ruling, Gibbons v. Ogden, which first established federal authority over interstate commerce including navigation by river. The US president assigned responsibility for the surveys to the Corps of Engineers (USACE).

Of the federally appropriated funds for surveys roads and canals of national importance, President James Monroe allocated one third of the sum to surveying a military highway connecting Detroit, Michigan with Fort Dearborn in Chicago, Illinois. Commerce and the mail soon traveled much faster on what was called the Chicago Road.

In a separate piece of legislation passed a month later that is often called the first Rivers and Harbors Act, Congress also appropriated $75,000 to improve navigation on the Ohio and Mississippi rivers by removing sandbars, snags, and other obstacles.  This work also was given to the Corps of Engineers, the only formally trained body of engineers in the new republic.

Later developments
With passage of the General Survey Act, Congress empowered the military to chart transportation improvements vital to the nations military protection or commercial growth. Army engineers helped design state and private roads, canals and railroads, and soldiers cleared forests and laid roadbeds; the work was conducted under the direction of the executive branch.

While the Act was initially seeded with an appropriation of $30,000, from 1824 to 1837, a total of $425,000 was provided to the Corps, with few restrictions, to undertake surveys and plan internal improvements. Although the act does not explicitly authorize it, much of the activity supported river and harbor projects, which the Corps planned and undertook, and surveys of roads and canals, and later railroads. Between 1824 and 1837, the Corps made 120 surveys and assisted or constructed 90 projects.

Over the years, more appropriations were made; and the system of roads and canals developed in other areas. The passage of the acts and the Corps' work on the various interior transportation systems were vital foundations for economic development and westward expansion of the country in the 19th century.

References

1824 in American law
United States federal transportation legislation